Al-Salihiyya or al-Salihiyah (and variations) may refer to:

 Al-Salihiyah, Damascus, a neighborhood in Damascus, Syria
 Al-Salihiyah, Hama, a village in Syria
 Al-Salihiyah, Deir ez-Zor Governorate, a village in Deir ez-Zor Governorate, Syria
 Al-Salihiyah, Rif Dimashq, a village in Rif Dimashq Governorate, Syria
 Al Salihiyah (Riyadh), a neighborhood in Riyadh, Saudi Arabia
 Al-Salihiyya, Palestine, a depopulated Palestinian village in the Hula valley
 El Salheya, a city in the Sharqia Governorate, Egypt
 Salihiyya, a Sufi order prominent in Somalia
 Salihiyya Madrasa, a medieval center of Islamic learning in Cairo, Egypt
 Salhiyeh (Saida), a village in the Sidon District, Lebanon
 Salehiyeh, a village in Razavi Khorasan Province, Iran
 Salehieh, a city in Tehran Province, Iran

See also
Salihids